Tassie is a surname. Notable people with the surname include:

Eric Tassie (1887–1936), Australian rules football administrator
Henry Tassie (1863–1945), accountant and politician in South Australia
James Tassie (1735–1799), Scottish gem engraver and modeller
William Tassie (1777–1860), Scottish gem engraver and modeller, nephew of James